Valencian Socialist Party was a political party in Valencia, Spain. It existed informally between 1962 and 1968, during the Francoist State, which had banned all the political organizations other than those in the Movimiento Nacional.

History
Its founders came from different left-wing currents. One sector came from Joventuts del Rat Penat led by Alfons Cucó. Another grouping had their origins in the Valencian Marxist Front (including Eliseu Climent).

In 1964 Valencian Socialist Action joined the PSV.

The PSV published Esquerra.

See also
 Socialist Party of the Valencian Country
 Socialist Party of the Valencian Country-PSOE
 Valencian nationalism

References

 Benito Sanz Díaz and Miquel Nadal i Tàrrega: Tradició i modernitat en el valencianisme. València, Edicions Tres i Quatre, 1996

Political parties in the Valencian Community
Political parties established in 1962
Political parties disestablished in 1968
Socialist parties in Spain
Anti-Francoism